United Nations Transitional Authority may refer to:

 United Nations Transitional Authority in Cambodia, a peacekeeping operation 1992–93
 United Nations Transitional Authority, a fictional organisation in the Mars trilogy by Kim Stanley Robinson